The 2008 Sony Ericsson Open women's singles was the women's singles event of the 2008 Sony Ericsson Open, a WTA Tier I tennis tournament held in late March and early April. Serena Williams was the defending champion, and won in the final 6–1, 5–7, 6–3 against Jelena Janković. It was the fifth time Williams had won the tournament, tying the record with Steffi Graf.

Seeds
All seeds received a bye into the second round.

Draw

Finals

Top half

Section 1

Section 2

Section 3

Section 4

Bottom half

Section 5

Section 6

Section 7

Section 8

Qualiying

Qualifying seeds

Qualifiers

Lucky losers

Qualifying draw

First qualifier

Second qualifier

Third qualifier

Fourth qualifier

Fifth qualifier

Sixth qualifier

Seventh qualifier

Eighth qualifier

Ninth qualifier

Tenth qualifier

Eleventh qualifier

Twelfth qualifier

References

External links
 Official results archive (ITF)
 Official results archive (WTA)

Sony Ericsson Open - Women's Singles, 2008
2008 Sony Ericsson Open